Epicauta waterhousei is an Asian species of oil beetle (Coleoptera: Meloidae) recorded from Thailand (Central and Northeast provinces), Cambodia, and Taiwan.

Description and pest status 
The adults of E. waterhousei, which emerge between April and July, are recognisable by their dull black elytra with a greyish longitudinal stripe, extending from humeral angle towards apex of elytron, and orange-red head does not have black dorsal markings.  Similar species include E. erythrocephala, the type and E. gorhami from Honshu, Japan.

This species has been recorded eating: groundnuts, soybeans, eggplants, tomatoes, and slender amaranth (Amaranthus viridis).

References

External links 

Meloidae
Beetles of Asia